Mayani Mamata is a 1970 Indian Telugu-language drama film, produced by Bhamidipati Bapaiah Panthulu under the Bhavani Pictures banner and directed by Kamalakara Kameswara Rao. It stars N. T. Rama Rao, B. Saroja Devi and Sobhan Babu, with music composed by Aswatthama.

Plot
Madhu (N. T. Rama Rao) is a noble writer, during silver jubilee celebrations of a popular magazine Vajrayudham, Madhu is felicitated by Editor Janakiramaiah (Dhulipala). Madhu falls in love with Janakiramaiah's daughter Jyothi (B. Saroja). Jagannadham (Nagabhushanam), a millionaire, is involved in many criminal activities and hates the Vajrayudham magazine as they try to expose him. Ravi (Sobhan Babu), son of Janakiramaiah loves Jagannadham's daughter Neela (Lakshmi). Jagannadham puts the paper into heavy debts and Janakiramaiah dies out of heart attack. Madhavaiah, a disguised form of Madhu, clears the debt and continues the press. Ravi sells his property to clear the rest of the debts and leaves to Bombay. On the way, Jagannatham's henchmen try to kill him and news spread that he is dead. After that, Madhu goes abroad on literary work when Jagannadham abuses Jyothi's character, so, she leaves the house and gets shelter in an orphanage as Seeta. Madhu returns searches for Jyothi, but fails, under some circumstances, he agrees to marry Neela. Here Neela tries to commit suicide, but Jyothi protects her, both of them become friends and makes her agree to the marriage. Meanwhile, Ravi comes back earning money to marry Neela but he is captured by Jagannatham. During the time of marriage, Naagu (Tyagaraju), a henchman of Jagannatham kidnaps Jyothi too, Madhavaiah protects both Ravi & Jyothi. All of them reach the marriage hall where Madhavaiah removes his disguise, proves that Jagannatham is the real culprit and makes him arrested. Finally, the movie ends with marriages of Madhu & Jyothi and Ravi & Neela.

Cast
N. T. Rama Rao as Madhu 
B. Saroja Devi as Jyothi 
Sobhan Babu as Ravi 
Lakshmi as Leela
Nagabhushanam as Jaganatham 
Dhulipala as Janaki Ramaiah 
Raja Babu as Anandam
Mukkamala as Kotaiah
Dr. Sivaramakrishnaiah as Doctor 
Sakshi Ranga Rao as Vivahala Veeraiah
Kumari Rukmini as Ammayamma 
Tyagaraju as Naagu 
Saradhi as Ramajogi
KK Sarma as Panakaalu 
Hemalatha as Shanthamma
Rama Prabha as Lachamma
Chalapathi Rao

Soundtrack

Music composed by  Aswatthama.

References

Indian drama films
1970s Telugu-language films
Films directed by Kamalakara Kameswara Rao